Ziegendorf is a municipality  in the Ludwigslust-Parchim district, in Mecklenburg-Vorpommern, Germany.

References

Ludwigslust-Parchim